Rivals of Waterdeep is an American actual play web series, with a podcast adaptation, where the cast plays Dungeons & Dragons using the fifth edition ruleset. It is set in the Forgotten Realms campaign setting and the show's Dungeon Master changes each season. The show premiered in June 2018; the show's thirteenth season ended in August 2022. It is one of the longest running official Dungeons & Dragons web series.

Cast 

 Aram Vartian as season one's Dungeon Master
 Carlos Luna as Noc Noc, a half-orc fighter, and as season one and two's Dungeon Master
 Tanya DePass as Selise Astorio, a human paladin, and as season eight's Dungeon Master
 Cicero Holmes as Perrin Underbough, a halfling bard, and as season five's Dungeon Master
 Surena Marie as Ashbourne, a half-elf ranger, and as season four's Dungeon Master
 Brandon Stennis as Rinn Leodin, an elven sorcerer
 Shareef Jackson as Shaka, a tiefling warlock, and as season three, six, and seven's Dungeon Master
 LaTia Jacquise as D'Hani Lai, an Arakockra monk, and as season nine and twelve's Dungeon Master
 Masood Haque as Gazrick Nomrad, a gnome druid, and as season ten's Dungeon Master
 Brian Gray as Virgil, an Aasimar sorcerer, and as season eleven's co-Dungeon Master
 Eugenio Vargas as Kent, a tiefling rogue, and as season eleven's co-Dungeon Master

Premise 
The show features a party of adventurers in the Forgotten Realms campaign setting with a rotating Dungeon Master. Rivals of Waterdeep initially adapted the Waterdeep: Dragon Heist adventure module. It has since adapted other official Dungeons & Dragons storylines such as Baldur's Gate: Descent Into Avernus.

Production

Development 
Greg Tito, a senior communications manager for Dungeons & Dragons, wanted to develop actual play shows after watching the success of the independent web series The Adventure Zone (launched in 2014) and Critical Role (launched in 2015) which led Wizards of the Coast (Wizards) to develop and launch Dice, Camera, Action in 2016. Tito said that show was "insanely popular" and "the success of that allowed us to create relationships with smaller tabletop roleplayers that were in front of an audience. The entire ecosystem began to grow from there". This led to the development of Rivals of Waterdeep.

Casting 
The Rivals of Waterdeep cast is made of a diverse group of performers based in Chicago. Tito initially recruited Tanya DePass for the show. Tito said he reached out to DePass because she was "a strong voice in the community and was in the Chicago area" and recruited "another group of roleplayers who just put their toe into doing D&D related content, but were mostly known as improv actors and comedians". Aram Vartian was season one's Dungeon Master with Carlos Luna, DePass, Cicero Holmes, Surena Marie, Brandon Stennis and Shareef Jackson as players.

Luna replaced Vartian as the Dungeon Master of season one after Vartian left the show mid-season; the Dungeon Master for Rivals of Waterdeep now rotates between various cast members. In 2020, Surena Marie and Luna left the show during the sixth season when they relocated to Los Angeles after Marie joined Critical Role Productions. LaTia Jacquise initially joined Rivals of Waterdeep as a guest in the sixth season at the 2020 C2E2 live show before becoming a permanent member. Cicero Holmes left the show at the end of the sixth season. Masood Haque joined as a guest for some Rivals of Waterdeep specials before becoming a regular cast member in the seventh season premiere. Brandon Stennis left the show at the end of the eighth season in 2020. In 2021, Brian Gray and Eugenio Vargas joined the cast in the ninth season premiere.

Filming 
Rivals of Waterdeep premiered in June 2018 with an episode at the Stream of Many Eyes event before launching as a fully produced show by Wizards later that month. During the COVID-19 pandemic, the show introduced social distancing measures. The show streamed from the 2020 D&D Celebration event. In July 2021, the show released its one hundredth episode. The show's fourteenth season premiered on October 16, 2022.

In 2022, Vargas commented that "the rotating DM model has really shown that you can tell coherent stories with consistent character through lines and keep the tone and style fresh by rotating your narrator. A table of all BIPOC players that has told stories for as long as the Rivals have is also a huge accomplishment, putting the lie to any statements of ‘there aren't BIPOC roleplayers out there for my show!' And, if we're able to conclude the Rivals tale like we want, we'll also be one of the few AP shows to make it to 20th level and show what adventuring at that level can look like".

Cancellation and future 
In 2021, Rivals of Waterdeep became independently produced and was listed as an official partner show of the Dungeons & Dragons brand. 

During the finale of Season 13 in August 2022, the cast revealed that Wizards of the Coast was ending its financial sponsorship of Rivals of Waterdeep; the show would become fully independent of Wizards of the Coast at the midway point of the upcoming Season 14. On October 12, 2022, Rivals of Waterdeep launched an IndieGoGo to crowdfund $60,000 to produce the final two and half seasons. Christian Hoffer, for ComicBook.com, commented that "Rivals previously launched a Patreon to help supplement funding and support for the show, but their IndieGoGo page notes that it hasn't raised the funds necessary to keep the show's production levels at their current standards" and that "Wizards has increasingly de-emphasized community-created shows on their Twitch and YouTube channels". The crowdfunding campaign ended with a total of $23,291 raised.

Episodes

Series overview

Season 1 (2018)

Season 2 (2018)

Season 3 (2019)

Season 4 (2019)

Season 5 (2019–20)

Season 6 (2020)

Season 7 (2020)

Season 8 (2020)

Specials

One-shots

Kids on Bikes

Reception 
The Guardian, The New York Times, VentureBeat, and Polygon all highlighted that Rivals of Waterdeep is part of the trend of actual play shows re-popularizing Dungeons & Dragons and that the show is notable for a cast "made up predominantly of women and people of color". G.L. van Os, in an essay in the book Watch Us Roll (2021), wrote that "voices from minorities will have to be sought out and lifted up, in order to create a more diverse playing field within actual play. Fortunately, there are several diverse actual play shows out there already, such as Rivals of Waterdeep and Dames and Dragons, they just have not received as much attention as Critical Role and The Adventure Zone yet". Amanda Farough, for VentureBeat, also highlighted that "Wizards of the Coast has been able to put a finer point on the impact of actual play shows on its brand awareness and sales. While the company wasn't willing to share its impression numbers, in 2019, live show viewership increased 49%. Of its total views, 15% are during live broadcasts (mostly represented by Twitch), with the remainder coming from video on demand on YouTube". 

By 2020, Rivals of Waterdeep was only the show that premiered at the 2018 Stream of Many Eyes event to still be on the air. Christian Hoffer, for ComicBook.com, called Rivals of Waterdeep the flagship show for the Dungeons & Dragons brand in 2020. Hoffer, in a separate article for ComicBook.com in 2021, wrote that "the longevity to Rivals of Waterdeep is impressive, not only because the show's characters are on the cusp of reaching the fabled 'Tier 4' levels that most D&D campaigns never reach, but also because of what the show means to the wider D&D community. Notably, Rivals of Waterdeep's cast are all people of color, offering important representation to a group typically underserviced in both the D&D streaming space and the wider tabletop roleplaying game community". Hoffer highlighted the show's innovation of Dungeon Master rotation which gives each season "a distinct flavor". He also highlighted that while the show "incorporates elements" of the official storylines, it makes these storylines its own.

Rivals of Waterdeep was included in Syfy Wire's "12 High Fantasy Podcasts That'll Take You on an Adventure During Your Commute" 2019 roundup and in Screen Rant's "D&D: The Best Livestreams & Podcast Campaigns Still Going In 2022" roundup.

See also 

 List of Dungeons & Dragons web series
 List of fantasy podcasts

References 

2010s YouTube series
2018 podcast debuts
2018 web series debuts
2020s YouTube series
Actual play podcasts
Actual play web series
American podcasts
American web series
Audio podcasts
Dungeons & Dragons actual play
Fantasy podcasts